The Senegalese patrol vessel Poponquine is a Senegalese Navy patrol vessel. The vessel was constructed in France and entered service in 1974. She has served on joint patrols with United States vessels.

Design and description
fully loaded. Poponquine is propelled by two SACM AGO V12 CZSHR diesel engines turning two shafts, rated .

The patrol vessel is armed with two Bofors /70 guns in a twin turret and single-mounted  machine guns. Poponquine is equipped with a Furuno surface search radar. The ship has a complement of 33 including three officers.

Construction and career
Poponquine was the second of three PR 48-class vessels ordered from French shipyards. The order for Poponquine was placed in 1973 with SFCN at their yard in Villeneuve-la-Garenne, France. The ship was laid down on 20 November 1973 and launched on 22 March 1974. Poponquine was commissioned on 10 August 1974.

Citations

References
 
 
 

1974 ships
Military of Senegal